, also known as Minamoto no Raikō, served the regents of the Fujiwara clan along with his brother Yorinobu, taking the violent measures the Fujiwara were themselves unable to take. He is one of the earliest Minamoto of historical note for his military exploits, and is known for quelling the bandits of Ōeyama.

His loyal service earned him the governorships of Izu Province, Kozuke and a number of others in turn, as well as a number of other high government positions. Yorimitsu served as commander of a regiment of the Imperial Guard, and as a secretary in the Ministry of War. When his father Minamoto no Mitsunaka died, he inherited Settsu Province.

Yorimitsu is usually accompanied by his four legendary retainers, known as the Shitennō (The Four Heavenly Kings). They were Watanabe no Tsuna, Sakata no Kintoki, Urabe no Suetake, and Usui Sadamitsu.

Legends 
Yorimitsu featured in a number of legends and tales, including the legend of Kintarō (Golden Boy a.k.a. Sakata no Kintoki), the legend of Shuten Dōji, and the legend of Tsuchigumo. The tachi (long sword) 'Dōjigiri' owned by Tokyo National Museum and selected as a National Treasure and Tenka-Goken ("Five Swords under Heaven"), and 'Onikirimaru' owned by Tada Shrine, have a legend that Yorimitsu beheaded Shuten Dōji. Also, three swords of the same name, 'Hizamaru' owned by Daikaku-ji Temple, Hakone Shrine and an individual, have a legend that Yorimitsu beat off Tsuchigumo.

The Karatsu Kunchi festival in Karatsu City, Saga Prefecture, features a large float inspired by the helmet of Minamoto, being partially devoured by the oni Shuten Douji.

Family 
Mother: Daughter of Minamoto no Suguru
Father:Minamoto no Mitsunaka
Wife:Daughter of Fujiwara no Motohira
1st son : Minamoto no Yorikuni
Wife:Daughter of Taira no Koretaka
2nd son : Minamoto no Yoriie
Wife:Daughter of Yoshishige no Tamemasa
3rd son:Minamoto no Yorimoto
4th son: Eiju
5th son:Minamoto no Yoriaki
daughter:Fujiwara no Michitsuna's wife

Poetry
Yorimitsu wrote a renga with his wife, which appears in the Kin'yō Wakashū (nos.703-704):
tade karu fune no suguru narikeri
asa madaki kararo no oto no kikoyuru wa
This translates as:
a boat harvesting smartweed is passing by
I thought I heard someone rowing smartly before dawn

In popular culture
Appears in the video game Nioh 2 as a female yokai hunter. She is voiced by Yūko Kaida.
Appears as a summonable character in the mobile game in Fate/Grand Order. She is voiced by Haruka Tomatsu.
Appears as the protagonist in the Otogi game series.
Appears as the ancestor of the Minamoto clan in the manga and anime series Toilet-bound Hanako-kun.
Appears as a character in the RPG game Onmyoji.

See also 

 Minamoto clan
 Seiwa Genji
 Toki clan
 Sagami (poet)
 Dōjigiri

Notes

References

Sansom, George (1958). 'A History of Japan to 1334'. Stanford, California: Stanford University Press.

948 births
1021 deaths

Japanese folklore
Minamoto clan
People of Heian-period Japan
Japanese legends
Deified Japanese people